Jane Tucker (born 20 October 1949) is a British actress, singer, songwriter, musician and keyboardist. She is best known for being part of the musical trio Rod, Jane and Freddy who appeared in many TV series, notably Rainbow. She was born into a family with an artistic background. Her grandmother was an opera singer, her mother Jean a pianist, and her father was Rex Tucker, the drama director for the BBC. Jane began to play the piano when she was three, being taught by her mother.

Tucker's first ambition was to follow in her mother's footsteps and become a concert pianist, but as a teenager she decided she would rather be an actress. This led her to study at the Guildhall School of Music & Drama, where she continued her piano and singing whilst embarking on a full-time drama course.

After graduating she worked in repertory theatre, touring, TV, and radio, during which she met and eventually married Rod Burton and, together with him and Matthew Corbett, formed the long-lasting musical trio Rod, Matt and Jane.  Corbett was replaced by Roger Walker in 1976 then by Freddy Marks in 1979 to form Rod, Jane and Freddy. Burton and Tucker divorced in 1979, following which she went on to marry Marks; Tucker remained married to Marks until his death in 2021.

In 1967, Tucker was a hostess on the Associated-Rediffusion game show Exit! It's the Way-Out Show, hosted by Ed Stewart.

References

External links

Rod, Jane and Freddy Biography
Rod, Jane and Freddy Songs 
Jane Tucker Official Facebook Fan Page
Official RJF Episode List
Rod, Jane and Freddy Mini Website
British Film Institute Screen Online Episode List

1949 births
Living people
English composers
English stage actresses
English television actresses